Naidu Hall from 1939 is an Indian retailer of Men, women and children's wear and wardrobe store based in the city of Tamil Nadu.

History

In 1939, a pioneer from a humble, hardworking background had a visionary dream of empowering Indian woman. He envisioned a bold and confident generation of young women, and the garments that would inspire this transformation. He introduced Indian woman to the brassiere, which was stitched at a small tailoring unit in Chennai.

He knew that the ladies of the time wouldn’t step out of their homes to make such purchases. So he employed door-to-door sales girls to visit them, and explain the benefits of adorning a brassiere. His attempts at empowering these women won him numbers of customers; this popularity inspired him to create a fashion landmark in the same city. The man was none other than our esteemed, M G Naidu. He was also responsible for establishing Naidu Hall, which is now a go-to brand across several generations of women in the state.

Mr. Venugopal owns VNH Naidu Hall Family Store which has now 17 stores in Tamil Nadu, 1 store in Puducherry & 1 store in Nellore, Andhra.

References

External links
 Official website

Companies based in Chennai
Indian companies established in 1939
Retail companies established in 1939